The 2018 Bacoor Strikers season is the 1st season of the franchise in the Maharlika Pilipinas Basketball League (MPBL).

Key dates
 June 12, 2018: Regular Season Begins.

Current roster

Datu Cup

Standings

Game log

|- style="background:#bfb;"
| 1
| June 12
| Cebu City
| W 76–71
| Chris Sumalinog (22)
| Mark Montuna (10)
| Gab Banal (6)
| Muntinlupa Sports Complex
| 1–0

|- style="background:#;"
| 2
| July 3
| Pampanga
| 
| 
| 
| 
| Olivares College Gymnasium
| 1–0
|- style="background:#;"
| 3
| July 12
| Bulacan
| 
| 
| 
| 
| Strike Gymnasium
| 1–0
|- style="background:#;"
| 4
| July 24
| Pasay
| 
| 
| 
| 
| Cuneta Astrodome
| 1–0

References

Bacoor Strikers Season, 2018
MPBL seasons by team